Kadhimiyya Women's Prison is a correctional facility in Kadhimiyya, Baghdad, Iraq. As of 2006, it was one of the main three prisons in Iraq which housed women. It was the only correctional facility in Baghdad which housed women until 2009.

It was originally a palace of the mother of King Faisal of Iraq, Queen Aurea.

As of 2006 it housed prisoners convicted of prostitution, terrorism, and murder.

References

Further reading
 "Inside Iraq's Only Women's Prison" (Archive). CBS News. December 22, 2007.

Prisons in Iraq
Women's prisons
Buildings and structures in Baghdad